The 2019–20 Nevada Wolf Pack men's basketball team represented the University of Nevada, Reno during the 2019–20 NCAA Division I men's basketball season. The Wolf Pack, led by first-year head coach Steve Alford, played their home games at the Lawlor Events Center on their campus in Reno, Nevada as members of the Mountain West Conference (MW). They finished the season 19–12, 12–6 in Mountain West play to finish in a three-way tie for second place. They lost in the quarterfinals of the Mountain West tournament to Wyoming.

Previous season
The Wolf Pack finished the season 29–5, 15–3 in Mountain West play to share the regular season Mountain West championship with Utah State. They defeated Boise State in the quarterfinals of the Mountain West tournament before losing in the semifinals to San Diego State. They received an at-large bid to the NCAA tournament where they lost in the first round to Florida.

On April 7, head coach Eric Musselman resigned to become the head coach at Arkansas. He finished at Nevada with a four-year record of 110–34, three trips to the NCAA Tournament, and were champions of the 2016 College Basketball Invitational.

On April 11, Nevada hired Steve Alford as their next head coach.

Offseason

Departures

Incoming transfers

2019 recruiting class

2020 recruiting class

Roster

Schedule and results

|-
!colspan=9 style=| Exhibition

|-
!colspan=9 style=| Regular season

|-
!colspan=9 style=| Mountain West tournament

Source

References

Nevada Wolf Pack men's basketball seasons
Nevada
Nevada Wolf Pack
Nevada Wolf Pack